Jon Terryl "Terry" Plumeri (November 28, 1944 – March 31, 2016) was an American musician, classical composer, orchestra conductor, double bassist, lecturer, teacher, producer, and film score composer.

Early life

Plumeri was born in Greensboro, North Carolina, and grew up in Tampa, Florida. He began studying music when he was 10. While attending Chamberlain High School, he was introduced to the double bass by band director Robert Price. He attended the Manhattan School of Music in New York City, studying with Robert Brennand, then the principal bassist in the New York Philharmonic. Later,  he studied composition and conducting with Antal Doráti. During his military service, he was a member of the Air Force Band.

Career

Plumeri played with many jazz greats including John Abercrombie, Cannonball Adderley, Herbie Hancock, Woody Herman, Quincy Jones, Yusef Lateef, Les McCann, Wayne Shorter, Frank Sinatra, Ralph Towner, and Joe Williams. He performed at many famous venues including Carnegie Hall (NYC); Royal Albert Hall (London); Odeon of Herodes Atticus (Athens), Tchaikovsky Concert Hall (Moscow), as well as the Newport, Monterey, and Montreux jazz festivals.

He performed, toured, and recorded with Roberta Flack from 1969 to 1974, playing electric and acoustic bass.  He appears on the albums Chapter Two, Killing Me Softly and Quiet Fire. In addition, he wrote the song "Conversation Love" on the album Killing Me Softly.

Later, he moved to Los Angeles to work in the film industry. He wrote the music for over 50 feature films, including the western Nate and the Colonel, Stephen King's Sometimes They Come Back, the family film Mr. Atlas, and the crime drama One False Move. His score for One False Move was nominated for "Best Score" by the IFC Independent Spirit Awards.

In later years, he was guest conductor for the Moscow Philharmonic Orchestra and was a frequent guest lecturer, teacher, music producer, and photographer.

Death

On the early morning of April 1, 2016, police responded to a well-being check at Plumeri's home in Dunnellon, Florida. Officers found him dead, with signs of extensive upper body trauma. Early speculation was that his death was a result of a home invasion, possibly linked to a series of such crimes in Citrus County. It was subsequently discovered that he was murdered by burglars (now in custody)

Discography
 He Who Lives in Many Places (1971)
 Ongoing (1978) Re-released on CD as "Water Garden" (2007)
 Plumeri Conducts Plumeri (1994)
  Film Music of Terry Plumeri (1994)
 Tchaikovsky/Plumeri/Moscow (1998)
 Blue In Green  (2005)
 Tchaikovsky Symphonies 4, 5, & 6/Johnterryl Plumeri-Conductor (2007)
 Chamber Music of Johnterryl Plumeri - Vol. 1 (2009)
  Johnterryl Plumeri and The Moscow Philharmonic Live at Tchaikovsky Hall (2012)

Filmography
 Scarecrows (1988)
 Sometimes They Come Back (1991)
 Lower Level (1991)
 One False Move (1992)
 Black Eagle (1993)
 Stepmonster (1993)
 Teenage Bonnie and Kelpto Clyde (1993)
 Night Eyes 3 (1993)
 Death Wish V: The Face of Death (1994)
 Angel of Destruction (1994)
 Raging Angels (1995)
 Mr. Atlas (1997)
 Black Sea Raid (2000)
 Knight Club (2001)
 Nate and the Colonel (2003)
 Love Takes Wing (2009)
 Zero Option (2014)

References

External links
 
 Official Facebook Page
 

1945 births
2016 deaths
20th-century American composers
21st-century American composers
2016 murders in the United States
Musicians from Greensboro, North Carolina
American conductors (music)
American male conductors (music)
American film score composers
American double-bassists
Male double-bassists
American jazz musicians
Musicians from Tampa, Florida
People from Dunnellon, Florida
Jazz musicians from North Carolina
American male film score composers
American male jazz musicians
People murdered in Florida
Male murder victims